Garlands Hospital was a mental health facility at Carleton near Carlisle in Cumbria, England.

History
The hospital, which was designed by Thomas Worthington and John Augustus Cory using a Corridor Plan layout, opened as the Cumberland and Westmorland Lunatic Asylum in January 1862. It joined the National Health Service as Garlands Hospital in 1948. Concerns were raised in Parliament about the amount of overcrowding in the hospital in 1955.

After the introduction of Care in the Community in the early 1980s, the hospital went into a period of decline and closed in March 1999. The administration block was subsequently converted into apartments.

References

Defunct hospitals in England
Hospitals in Cumbria
Hospital buildings completed in 1862
Hospitals established in 1862
1862 establishments in England
Former psychiatric hospitals in England
Hospitals disestablished in 1999
1999 disestablishments in England